Vladimir L’vovich Kvint (Russian: Владимир Львович Квинт) is a Russian-American economist and strategist, and President of the International Academy of Emerging Markets. Since 2007, he has been the Chair of the Department of Economic and Financial Strategy at the Moscow School of Economics of the Lomonosov Moscow State University. Kvint is also the Head of the Center for Strategic Studies at Institute of Complex Systems Mathematical Research of this University. He is a Foreign Member (ad vitum) of the Russian Academy of Sciences.

Since 2019, Kvint is a Visiting Professor at Department of Economics of Shanghai University. In 2010, Kvint was elected a Fellow of the World Academy of Art and Science. He is a U.S. Fulbright Scholar (2001) and has been a professor at Fordham, New York University, and American University and Adjunct Professor at La Salle University as well as Babson College. In 2018, Kvint was awarded Annual Lomonosov Prize in Science of Highest Degree by Lomonosov Moscow State University for his "Studies of Theory of Strategy and Methodology of Strategizing". In 2022 Dr. Kvint became a Laureate of the State Prize of the Republic of Uzbekistan in the Field of Science and Technology for the monograph “The Strategic Leadership of Amir Timur: Comments on the Code”.

Kvint has been a consultant to governments of several countries and private companies. He was a consultant at architectural and planning company RMJM, and was Director for Emerging Markets at Arthur Andersen in NYC. Kvint's work appeared in The New York Times  and Harvard Business Review, among others. He has been a contributor to Forbes magazine in which he published his most profound forecast on February 5, 1990, predicting the exact year - 1991 - of the fall of the Soviet Union. In addition, Kvint is a member of the Editorial Boards of several professional publications.

Early life
Vladimir Kvint was born in Krasnoyarsk, Siberia into a family of engineers. He studied in Railroad elementary and junior high school. Then he moved to Norilsk, the northernmost city in the world, located 300 kilometres above the Arctic Circle. He began his 14-year career in the non-ferrous metals industry at the age of 14 as a construction and metal worker. Most of Kvint's education was completed in parallel with his professional and athletic activities (boxing). Kvint established himself as the chief economist and vice chairman of a major Russian high-tech company, successfully earned his Ph.D. in economics, and was educated in the fields of mining-electrical engineering and law by the age of 27.

Early career in industry

Norilsk Mining - metallurgical concern - MMC Norilsk Nickel

Despite an invitation to work as an associate professor in Moscow, Kvint returned to Norilsk. Between 1975 and 1978, he continued his work in the mining-metallurgical industry. He founded and was Chief of the Department of Organization Management at the Norilsk Mining –Metallurgical Concern, later renamed MMC Norilsk Nickel, which was the largest Russian enterprise (150,000 employees) and still the largest producer worldwide of nickel, cobalt, platinum, palladium and osmium. Under his leadership, the company's first general organizational structure, focusing on the strategic improvement of final products was developed. The theoretical results of his work were published in Moscow in 1976, in The Acceleration of the Industrial-Technical Development. This book received the U.S.S.R. Annual Award "Best Popular Scholarly Book of the Year".

Sib Tsvemet Automatica

In 1976, Kvint was promoted to the position of deputy director general and deputy chairman of "SibTsvemetAutomatica", a scientific-technological company, which automated the non-ferrous metals industry throughout the former U.S.S.R.[4]. He was responsible for economic policy, business planning, the organization of compensation systems, and accounting departments in this company of 5,000 employees. Under Kvint's economic strategy, this company became one of the first self-sufficient firms in the U.S.S.R. despite the Soviet command planning system. In addition, he was Chief of the Forecasting Economics Laboratory of the Non-ferrous Metals and Gold Industry, and prepared strategies and forecasts for the non-ferrous and precious metals and diamond industries.

Later career in education and lecturing

Arctic Seaway Economic Expedition

In 1978, he was invited to join the Academy of Sciences of the Soviet Union, and was elected as the Chief of the Department of Regional Problems of Scientific-Technological Progress at the Institute of Economy and Industrial Organization of the Siberian Branch of the USSR Academy of Sciences. The Siberian School of Economics was at that time under the leadership of the world-renowned economists Abel Aganbegyan and Nobel Laureate in Economics Leonid Kantorovich.

In the Academy, Kvint found a lack of accurate empirical statistics and economic information. As a result, many economic studies based on this incorrect information had no practical use. With Kvint's business experience, he recognized this problem and developed the methods of studying economic situations, natural resources, and strategic business opportunities through the organization of complex economic expeditions.

In 1979 the chairman of the Siberian branch of the Academy appointed him to head these expeditions. Several of these major expeditions were unprecedented. For example, in 1980 the academicians ventured across the entire eight seas of the Arctic Seaway by ship, helicopter and SUV. Another economic expedition traveled through three seas along the entire Pacific Coast of Russia to evaluate the area's natural resources and productive forces.

Research at the Russian Academy of Sciences (Moscow)

In 1982, Kvint was elected as a senior researcher and then as the Head of Department and later a leading scholar at the Institute of Economics of the USSR Academy of Sciences(Moscow). During these nine years he discovered and developed the concept of two new global trends: Regionalization and Technologization. He defined the category of regional scientific-technological policy and the role of this policy in the reduction of poverty and ecological protection. In the late 1980s he came up with the theory of regional and global emerging markets.

In 1986, he wrote the report on the organization of strategic development of scientific-technological process which he brought to the attention of the Council of Ministers of the Soviet Union, explaining that without the activation of these factors, as well as the function of motivation, the Soviet Union would have no economic future. After this predication, Kvint again faced a great deal of pressure from the Soviet power structure.

In 1985, Kvint prepared his second Doctoral dissertation on the "Regional Management of the Scientific-Technological Development of the National Economy". Among the consequences of Kvint's recommendations would have been the decentralization of the Soviet command economy. As a result, he was not allowed to present his dissertation to the Scientific Council until February 1988, when he finally received the highest European scientific degree- Habilitation-"Doctor of Sciences in Economics". In 1989, he received the lifetime title of "Professor of Political Economy" - the highest state academic title in the former Soviet Bloc. Many years later, in 2011 by decree of the President of the Russian Federation he was awarded with the title of Honored professor of Higher Education of the Russian Federation.

The fundamental ideas of Kvint's theories were explored in his dissertations and books. Since 1989, he has continued his studies in Austria, and then in the United States. However, the development of his theory of the global emerging market has its roots in all of his years of scholarly activity. For these studies, Kvint would later receive international recognition Developing his earlier strategic studies he contributed to theory of strategy and came up with his own theory of holistic strategy.

International professorship and lecturing

In 1988 and 1989, Kvint was finally allowed to travel outside of the Soviet Union, upon which he gave speeches and lectures on the results of his studies. He was invited to many universities and prestigious academic centers in Austria, Switzerland, Italy, Belgium, Luxembourg, China, the United States, Great Britain, and Germany. Among his many lectures was his speech in front of the Presidium of the Royal Belgian Academy of Sciences. In 1989-1990, he worked as a visiting professor at the Vienna University of Economics and Business Administration. During his academic career he was invited to give lectures in Universities and Academic Centers of many nations  including: Abu Dhabi, Albania, Armenia, Austria, Bahrain, Belgium, Belorussia, Brazil, Bulgaria, China, Croatia, England, Estonia, Georgia, Germany, Hungary, Italy, Kazakhstan, Kyrgyzstan, Latvia, Lithuania, Mongolia, Poland, Russia, Scotland, Slovenia, South Korea, Spain, Swiden, Switzerland,Turkey, Turkmenistan, Ukraine, United Nations, Uruguay and Uzbekistan. In 2009 Kvint gave a lecture at the London School of Economics and Political Science, in 2010 in the Scottish Parliament, in 2011 at Imperial College London, and 2009 - 2013 in The University of Edinburgh.

Since 1990, Kvint has lived and worked in the United States where he has been granted citizenship. In 1990, he gave lectures and consultations in several think tanks and leading corporations of the United States including the RAND Corporation, Kissinger Associates, General Electric, General Motors, Transamerica, Timex, and the Exxon Corporation, among others.

Professorship in the United States

Kvint's first professorship was in the international economics department at Babson College in Massachusetts. Following this, from 1990, until the fall of 2004, Kvint was a professor of management systems and international business at Fordham University's Gabelli School of Business. In addition to his professorship at Fordham, from 1995 through 2000 Kvint served as an Adjunct Professor of International Business Strategy at New York University's Stern School of Business. He developed major elements of his theory of the Global Emerging Market and Theory of Holistic Strategy, presented it at many conferences and published six books and several articles in major U.S. academic and business magazines, journals and newspapers. Between 2004 and 2007, he was a professor of international business at the Kogod School of Business of American University in Washington, D.C. During this period, he taught course in the fundamentals of international business, the global marketplace, export-import management, and comparative management systems, and he developed and taught the global emerging market course for Honors Program students. Between 2005-2016 Vladimir Kvint has been an Adjunct Professor of international business strategy at La Salle University in Pennsylvania.

US and European consulting practice and directorship
Since 1989, Kvint has been an Economic Consultant to the General Electric Corporation, Cable & Wireless plc of Great Britain, Timex Corporation, Tosco Corporation, Engelhard Corporation, and the law firm of Hogan and Hartson. From 1992-1998, Kvint was the director of emerging markets at Arthur Andersen. Between 1997 and 2000 he was a member of the Board of Directors of PLD Telecom (later merged with Metromedia International Telecom Inc.) a publicly traded company on NASDAQ and the Toronto Stock Exchange.

Kvint's consulting and professorships have continued his studies and research. He was the chairman of the World Economic Development Congress' Summit for Institutional Investors (Washington D.C, 1995); the World Economic Development Congress' Global Risk Management Summit, (Washington D.C, 1996); and the International Banking Congress: US-CIS and Baltics, (NYC, 1997). He was an economic advisor to the president of the United Nations General Assembly. Between 1996 and 2001, Kvint was an economic adviser to Simeon Saxe-Coburg-Gotha, who would become prime minister of Bulgaria. Between 2001 and 2005, Kvint was an advisor to the government of Albania. Between 2006 - 2008, he was Chairman of the Board of Directors of the  "Morskoiy Vokzal"  seaport terminal in Saint Petersburg, Russia. From 2009 to 2012, he was a consultant at the architectural firm RMJM. From 2012 - 2015, he was a member of the board of directors of the fishing company NBAM, and since 2015, he has been Chairman of the Pacific Investment Group Expert Council.

Awards
In 1992, Kvint was awarded a two-year scholarship by the Wexner Heritage Foundation and in 1993, was presented with the Faculty Scholarship Award by the University of Southern California. In 1997, the New England Center for International and Regional Studies awarded Kvint the title of Honorary Fellow.

In 2001, as a U.S. Fulbright Scholar Award recipient, Kvint conducted studies, lectured at the University of Vlore and the University of Tirana in Albania, and provided consultations to the government of Albania. For these activities, he was given an award by the U.S State Department in 2002. In 2002, Fordham University honored Kvint's professorship with the annual GLOBE Award.

On September 20, 2006, by decree of the President of the Russian Federation Vladimir Putin, Kvint was awarded with one of the highest awards of Russia - the Order of Friendship.

In 2010 he received International Award - Gold Kondratiev Medal, issuing once in three years "For Achievements in Social Studies" by the International N. D. Kondratieff Foundation and the Russian Academy of Natural Sciences (RAEN). In the same year Vladimir L. Kvint, has been elected as a Fellow of The World Academy of Art and Science.
"This election acknowledges Vladimir Kvint`s impact on the development of world economic science as well as his fundamental works in the global emerging market and strategic research".
In 2018 Kvint was awarded by Academic Council of Lomonosov Moscow State University with Annual Lomonosov Prize of Highest Degree for “His Studies of Theory of Strategy and Methodology of Strategizing”. In 2022 Dr. Kvint became a Laureate of the State Prize of the Republic of Uzbekistan in the Field of Science and Technology for the Research Monograph “The Strategic Leadership of Amir Timur: Comments on the Code”.

Topics of research and forecasts
35 years of Kvint's research and scholarly activity have been dedicated to the creation of theories on new regional economic development and strategy and emerging market countries. Among Kvint's achievements are:

Theory of Regionalization of Scientific-Technological Progress
Evaluation of the Role of the Scientific-Technical Strategy in the Regional Economy
Theory of the Global Emerging Market
Theory of Strategy and its implementation in the Global Emerging Market
Theory of Holistic Strategy

While his strategic analysis and forecasts of events are not infrequently outspoken, controversial, and at times even criticized as outlandish or impossible [Forbes Global, January 24, 2000 p. 24], in hindsight, they have been remarkably accurate and insightful. Indeed, it becomes evident that his forecasts are soundly grounded in detailed analysis of fact.

One of his most accurate forecasts was published in 1989, proclaiming that “by 1992 there will be no country called the Soviet Union”. In fact, the Soviet Union disappeared in December 1991. Kvint's cover story in the February 1990 issue of Forbes magazine was called “Russia Should Quit the Soviet Union”, and received worldwide attention.

Among his other forecasts are:

accurate prediction of exchange rate between East and West Deutsche Mark during unification of Germany [Basler Zeitung (Basel, Switzerland), March 20, 1990, p. 1 (in German) and Der Neue Tag (Bavaria Germany) November 28, 1989, p. 1]
prediction of an early resignation of President Boris Yeltsin and his replacement by a successor in uniform

Published works
Kvint is the author of 35 books and over 450 articles. Many of his articles have been published and translated around the world, including in Forbes magazine, the Harvard Business Review, Institutional Investor, Journal of Accountancy, International Executive, The New York Times, The Times (London), Die Presse (Austria), The New Times (Moscow), and others.

Books
 The Acceleration of Technological Development of Production, Moscow, Knowledge, 1976
 The Introduction and Use of Automation Systems: Regional Economic Aspect, Moscow, Knowledge, 1981
 The Krasnoyarsk Economic Experiment, Moscow, 1982
 The Polar Star Above Us, Moscow, 1984
 Management of Scientific Technological Progress: Regional Aspect, Moscow, Science, 1986
 Economic and Scientific- Technical Information (Co-Author), Moscow, 1987
 The Development of the Economy of Daghestan (Co-Author), Makhachkala, Daghestan, 1988
 Capitalizing on the New Russia (The Barefoot Shoemaker), Arcade, New York, 1993, 
 Creating and Managing International Joint Ventures(Co-author), Quorum Books,  Westport, Connecticut, (USA), London, (UK), 1996,
 Emerging Market of Russia: Sourcebook for Investment and Trade,(Author, Editor-In-Chief), John Wiley & Sons,   New York,(also published in Singapore, Toronto - Canada, Chichester - UK, Weinheim - Germany, Brisbane - Australia),  1998, 
 The Global Emerging Market in Transition, Fordham University Press, 1999, . 2000.  2nd Extended Edition, New York, 2004, 2006. (This book was the subject of a special conference in the UN headquarters in New York City in 1999).
 International M&A, Joint Ventures and Beyond,(Co-Author), John Wiley & Sons, New York, 1998, 2002. 
 Investing Under Fire: Winning Strategies, (Co-Author), Bloomberg Press, New York, 2003. ( With co-authors including General Wesley K. Clark, Ambassador Dennis Ross, and Vice Chairman of Goldman Sachs International, Robert D. Hormats. Kvint's contribution considered how to calculate the risk of foreign direct investment). 
 The Global Emerging Market: Strategic Management and Economics, Routledge, New York, London, 2009.  ( This book was the subject of UN Social and Economic Council symposium in the UN headquarters in New York City in February 2009 )
 Business and Strategic Management, St.Petersburg University of Humanities and Social Sciences' Publishing House, St.Petersburg, Russia, 2010.
 Strategic Management and Economics in the Global Emerging Market, Bujet Publishing House, Moscow, 2012. 
 Terrorism and Extremism: Strategic Negative Economic Impact, NWIM RANEPA, St.Petersburg, Russia, 2016. ISBN 
 Strategy for the Global Market: Theory and Practical Applications, Routledge, New York, London, 2016. [**. 
 The Russian Far East: Strategic Priorities for Susteinable Development, ( with co-author ), 
Apple Academic Press, New York, 2016. [**
 Teorija in Praksa Strategije, University of Primorska Publishing House, Koper, Slovenia, 2017.  [**23 (Slovenian)
 On the Origins of the Theory of Strategy (The 200th Anniversary of the Publishing of General Jomini's Work on Theory of Strategy), North-Western Institute of Management, St.Petersburg, Russia, 2017. 
 Gazing into the Future: A Study of Prophets, Visionaries, Leaders and Strategists, North-Western Institute of Management, St.Petersburg, Russia, 2018. 
 KU ŹRÓDŁOM TEORII STRATEGII: 200-lecie wydania pracy teoretycznej generała Jominiego, TEKST, Lublin, Poland, 2018. (Polish)
 Strategizing: Theory and Practice, TASVIR, Tashkent, Uzbekistan, 2018. (Uzbek)
 Teoretyczne i Metodologiczne Podstawy Strategii, Poznanie, Warszawa, Poland, 2019. (Polish)
 The Concept of Strategizing. Vol.I, NWIM RANEPA, St.Petersburg, Russia, 2019. 
 Teoria dhe Praktika e Strategjise, IPPM, Tirana, Albania, 2019. (Albanian)
 Strategic Development Concepts, Mongolian University of Science and Technology, Ulaanbaatar, Mongolia, 2019. (Mongolian)
 Strategizing: Theory and Practice (Digest). Maximum, Osh, Kyrgyzstan, 2019. (Kyrgyz)
 The Concept of Strategizing. Vol.II, NWIM RANEPA, St.Petersburg, Russia, 2020. 
 The Concept of Strategizing, Kemerovo State University, Kemerovo, Russia, 2020. 
 Konzepte der Strategie Impulse für Führungskräfte, UVK Verlagsgesellschaft mbH, Munich, Germany, 2021. (German)
 ‘’战略规划概观 - The Concept of Strategizing, Shanghai University Press, Shanghai, China, 2021.   (Chinese)
 ‘’The Strategic Leadership of Amir Timur: Comments on the Timur’s Code of Rules / V. L. Kvint (introduction, commentary).- SPb.,Russia : NWIM RANEPA, 2021. - 204 p. (“Strategist’ Library” series). 
   Strategiczne przywództwo Amira Timura : Kvint’s komentarze do "Kodeksu Timira . Warsaw : Wydawnictwo Poznanie, 2021. - 256 pgs.  (Polish)
   Амир Темурнинг стратегик етакчилиги: «Тузуклар»га изохлар / В. Л. Квинт (сузбоши, изохлар) [The Strategic leadership of Amir Timur: Comments on "Tuzuklar"(Timur’s Code of Rules) / V.  L.  Kvint (preface, comments)]. — СПб. : ИПЦ СЗИУ РАНХиГС, 2021. — 224 pgs. —(«Стратег кутубхонаси» туркуми)[Strategic Library ”series].  (узб.)  (Uzbek)
   Стратегийы теорийы гуыраентаем. Инаелар Жоминийы теоретикон куысты рауагъдыл 200 азы саеххаесты фаедыл [On the Origins of the Theory of Strategy (The 200th Anniversary of the Publishing of General Jomini's Work on Theory of Strategy)] — М.: Издательский Дом "Бюджет", 2021. —52 pgs. ,  (Ossetian)
   Амир Тимурду чыгаан стратег катары улуулугу: Мыйзамдык жоболор жыйнагына баяндамалар  / В.Л. Квинт — Бишкек: КРСУнун басмасы Бишкек[The Grandeur of Amir Timur as a Great Strategist: Commentary on the Timur’s Code of Rules  / V.L.  Kvint - Bishkek: KRSU Publishing House Bishkek], 2022. —224 pgs. ,  (Kyrgyz)
Ossetian)
    Strategizing Societal Transformation: Knowledge, Technologies, and Noonomy  ''
By Vladimir L. Kvint, Sergey D. Bodrunov, Apple Academic Press, New York, 2023,
228 Pages

See also
 Emerging markets
 Strategy
 Strategist

References

1949 births
Living people
21st-century American economists
Fordham University faculty
Foreign Members of the Russian Academy of Sciences
N. D. Kondratieff Medal laureates
New York University faculty
Plekhanov Russian University of Economics alumni
Russian economists
Writers from Krasnoyarsk